NOAAS Rude (S 590) was an American Rude-class hydrographic survey ship that was in commission in the National Oceanic and Atmospheric Administration (NOAA) from 1970 to 2008. Prior to its NOAA career, it was in commission in the United States Coast and Geodetic Survey from 1967 to 1970 as USC&GS Rude (ASV 90). It was named for Gilbert T. Rude, former Chief of the Division of Coastal Surveys of the Coast and Geodetic Survey.

In 2008, NOAA decommissioned Rude and transferred her to the United States Environmental Protection Agency (EPA). Renamed US EPA Lake Explorer II, she entered EPA service as a research ship in 2009.

USC&GS and NOAA

Construction and commissioning

Rude (pronounced "Rudy") was built as an "auxiliary survey vessel" (ASV) for the U.S. Coast and Geodetic Survey at the Jackobson Shipyard in Oyster Bay, New York. It was launched on 17 August 1966 and commissioned into Coast and Geodetic Survey service on 29 March 1967 as USC&GS Rude (ASV 90). When the Coast and Geodetic Survey merged with other United States Government organizations to form NOAA on 3 October 1970, it became a part of the NOAA fleet as NOAAS Rude (S 590).

Technical details
It had a total of 11 bunk spaces. The ship's mess room could seat seven. It carried a complement of four NOAA Corps officers and seven other crew members, including one licensed engineer.

Rude′s deck equipment featured one winch and one telescoping boom crane.

For its primary mission of inshore hydrographic surveys, Rude had a differential global positioning system (DGPS), a multibeam sonar system, and side-scan sonar (SSS). It also was equipped for diving operations to allow human investigation of submerged obstacles. It had a  fiberglass launch for utility or rescue operations.

Operations

The Coast and Geodetic Survey acquired Rude and a sister ship of identical design, USC&GS Heck (ASV 91), later NOAAS Heck (S 591), to conduct wire-drag survey operations together, replacing the survey ships USC&GS Hilgard (ASV 82) and USC&GS Wainwright (ASV 83) in that role. Like Hilgard and Wainright before them, Rude and Heck worked together under a single command conducting wire drag surveys, clearing large swaths between them with a submerged wire.

In 1978, Rude and Heck came to the assistance of the burning research vessel Midnight Sun, rescuing Midnight Sun′s crew and scientists and saving the vessel from total loss. Rude′s crew took aboard all 20 of Midnight Suns crew members and scientists, who were afloat in life rafts near Midnight Sun, administered first aid to them, and transported them to shore.  Hecks crew, meanwhile, fought the fire aboard Midnight Sun for 20 consecutive hours and saved Midnight Sun from sinking. For their efforts in saving Midnight Sun and its crew, the crews of Rude and Heck received the Department of Commerce Silver Medal in 1978.

Electronic technologies eventually arrived that allow a single vessel to do the same surveying work using sidescan and multibeam sonar that formerly required two vessels working together using the wire-drag technique. In 1989, Rude and Heck  began working independently thanks to the improved technology, and Heck was decommissioned in 1995 and sold in 2001.

Rude remained in commission and was sometimes called upon to assist the United States Coast Guard and United States Navy in search, rescue, and recovery operations. It located the wreckage of TWA Flight 800 off Moriches, New York in 1996, receiving a Department of Commerce Gold Medal that year for its efforts, and later located the plane wreckage of John F. Kennedy Jr. off Martha's Vineyard, Massachusetts in 1999.Flight 800 ship to be retired - Newsday - March 24, 2008

Rude was decommissioned on 25 March 2008 and placed in reserve in NOAA′s Atlantic Fleet.

Honors and awards
  Department of Commerce Silver Medal, 1978

In a ceremony on 23 October 1978 in Washington, D.C., Rude and Heck were awarded the Department of Commerce Silver Medal for "rare and distinguished contributions of major significance to the Department, the nation, and the world." for their assistance to Midnight Sun. The program for the ceremony cited the ships' achievements as follows:

LCDR Robert V. Smart, LTJG Kenneth G. Vadnais, ENS Samuel P. De Bow, Jr., Messrs. William N. Brooks, Johnnie B. Davis, James S. Eamons, Kenneth M. Jones, Frank Krusz, Jr., Anthony W. Styron, and Eijah J. Willis of the NOAA Ship RUDE and LCDR Thomas W. Ruszala, LTJG Charles E. Gross, and Messrs. Mark Aldridge, Horace B. Harris, Charles J. Gentilcore, Dennis S. Brickhouse, Robert T. Lindton, Arnold K. Pedersen, Joseph Wiggins, and James P. Taylor of the NOAA Ship HECK are recognized for rescuing the crew and scientists from the burning vessel M/V MIDNIGHT SUN and saving the vessel from total loss. The crew of the NOAA Ship RUDE safely took aboard all 20 crew members of the burning vessel who were afloat in life rafts near the vessel. First aid was administered, and the crew members of the disabled ship were transported safely to shore. The crew of the NOAA Ship HECK displayed outstanding seamanship through their efforts over 20 consecutive hours to fight the fire. The actions of the two ships' crew members demonstrated superior performance and exceptional courage in a maritime emergency beyond the call of duty.

  Department of Commerce Gold Medal 1996

In a ceremony on 4 December 1996 in Washington, D.C., Rude was awarded the Department of Commerce Gold Medal for "rare and distinguished contributions of major significance to the Department, the nation, and the world." for its response as a part of the NOAA TWA Flight 800 Disaster Response Team. The program for the ceremony cited the team's achievements as follows:

The NOAA TWA Flight 800 Disaster Response Team is recognized for their crucial role in providing precise map mosaics of the Atlantic Ocean debris fields off Long Island, New York. The mosaics were instrumental in victim recovery, salvage and investigative efforts. Within hours after the disaster, the NOAA team arrived on the site and began surveying the ocean floor with highly sophisticated side scan sonar equipment. The team utilized the sonar data to produce precisely located graphic descriptions of the debris fields. Without the products and services provided by the response team, the recovery of the victims and the wreckage would have been a nearly impossible task.

Environmental Protection Agency
Acquisition
In August 2008, NOAA transferred the ship to the United States Environmental Protection Agency (EPA) at the NOAA Marine Operations Base at Norfolk, Virginia. The EPA renamed her UIS EPA Lake Explorer II''' and earmarked her for environmental research operations on the Great Lakes.

Conversion
After acquiring Lake Explorer II, the EPA converted it for use as a research vessel. The EPA retained all of the ship's navigation equipment, its A-frame, and its accommodations of 11 bunks located in four double stateroom and one triple stateroom. However, the EPA removed all of its NOAA science equipment and installed new equipment appropriate to its new environmental research role, including a winch and an additional frame.

On 22 September 2008, while Lake Explorer II was moored in the Elizabeth River at the NOAA Marine Operations Base at Norfolk, still without its new name painted on its side, it suffered a fracture in a stern tube which ran through its center fuel tank, causing it to spill an estimated 1,400 U.S. gallons (5,300 liters) of diesel fuel into the river.Anonymous, "Environmental Protection Agency Operated Vessel Spills 1,400 Gallons of Diesel at NOAA Operating Base," The Maritime Executive, undated Retrieved August 20, 2018 Its crew contained the leak, and a combined effort by the U.S. Coast Guard, Norfolk Fire Department, Virginia Department of Environmental Quality, and an oil spill response organization the EPA hired contained and cleaned up the spill.

During the summer of 2009, Lake Explorer II was hauled out of the water at a shipyard in Portsmouth, Virginia, for upgrades to its structural components. A major part of this phase of its conversion was the installation of a new tank to hold all sewage generated aboard the ship, to ensure its compliance with strict zero-discharge standards for sewage on the Great Lakes. While it was out of the water at Portsmouth, the shipyard also replaced shaft tubes, replaced or rebuilt sea valves, painted its bottom with new anti-foul paint, and conducted a routine out-of-water inspection of its equipment and hull.

In EPA service, the ship has a crew of four – a captain, first mate, chief engineer, and first engineer – and can embark up to seven scientists.

Operations
On 1 October 2009, with the conversion complete, Lake Explorer II and its crew departed the NOAA Marine Operations Base at Norfolk and, after a two-day transit in Atlantic Ocean waters, arrived in New York Harbor on 3 October 2009. Following a stay at New York City, the ship proceeded up the Hudson River to Albany, New York, where it entered the New York State Canal System. Over the course of four days, it navigated the Erie Canal and Oswego Canal, passing through 30 locks, before entering Lake Ontario at Oswego, New York. Lake Explorer II then crossed Lake Ontario, Lake Erie, Lake Huron, and Lake Superior, passing through nine more canal locks along the way, before arriving at its new home port,  Duluth, Minnesota, on 16 October 2009, completing a 15-day journey of 1,580 miles.

Operated throughout the Great Lakes by the EPA's Mid-Continent Ecology Division, Lake Explorer II conducts research surveys designed to develop a comprehensive environmental assessment of coastal conditions in the Great Lakes and demonstrate a new generation of lakewide assessment designs which include nearshore ecosystems in lakewide assessment.epa.gov United States Environmental Protection Agency Mid-Continent Ecology Division "Research Vessel (R/V) Lake Explorer II Overview" Retrieved August 20, 2018 Its work includes the use of advanced technologies for sampling aquatic life, water quality, and sediments, including the deployment of advanced in situ environmental sensing system packages, which make continuous synoptic maps of water and plankton properties, allowing for greater efficiency during extensive research surveys.

After being hauled out of the water for drydocking, upgrades, and the design, fabrication, and installation of a new bulbous bow at Great Lakes Shipyard in Cleveland, Ohio, Lake Explorer II'' was relaunched on 27 October 2014. She got underway to return to Duluth on 28 October 2014.

See also
NOAA ships and aircraft

References

NOAA History, A Science Odyssey: Hall of Honor: Commerce Medals Presented for Lifesaving and the Protection of Property 1955-2000

External links
 
 
 Video "LAKE EXPLORER II EPA Research Vessel" on YouTube

Ships of the National Oceanic and Atmospheric Administration
Survey ships of the United States
Rude-class hydrographic survey ships
Ships built in Oyster Bay, New York
1966 ships
Virginia-related ships
Maritime incidents in 1978
Maritime incidents in 2008
Recipients of the Department of Commerce Silver Medal
Department of Commerce Gold Medal
Ships of the United States Environmental Protection Agency